Menendez: Blood Brothers is a 2017 television film directed by Fenton Bailey and Randy Barbato, written by Abdi Nazemian, and starring Courtney Love, Nico Tortorella, Benito Martinez, and Myko Olivier. The film is based on the lives of Lyle and Erik Menendez, two brothers who were convicted of murdering their parents in Beverly Hills, California in 1989.

It aired on the Lifetime network in North America on June 11, 2017.

Cast
 Courtney Love as Mary "Kitty" Menendez
 Nico Tortorella as Lyle Menendez
 Myko Olivier as Erik Menendez
 Benito Martinez as José Menendez
 Meredith Scott Lynn as Leslie Abramson
 Alison Wandzura as Jill Lansing
 Kai Bradbury as Glenn Stevens
 Tom Belding as Male Juror
 Artine Brown as Leslie Zoeller
 Angelo Renai as Businessman 
 Ash Lee as Lester Kuriyama

Production
On January 31, 2017, it was announced that Courtney Love had joined the cast of the film. The film was shot in Vancouver, British Columbia, Canada, between February and March 2017.

Reception
Ken Tucker, writing for Yahoo!TV, found the film to be "a melodramatic mess"  that "resembles a creepy high-school play" in quality.
Similarly, New York Post critic Robert Rorke lambasted the murder scene in Menendez: Blood Brothers  as "creepy and amateurish" and felt the film generally lacked any insight. 
Broadly'''s Mitchell Sunderland, on the other hand, praised the film's high/low tone and Love in particular, stating that  "Courtney Love's performance as Kitty holds the film together", highlighting her ability to be "over-the-top in one scene, and subtle the next, without the performance seeming disjointed."

See alsoMenendez: A Killing in Beverly Hills'', a 1994 film also based on the murders.

References

External links

Menendez: Blood Brothers at Rotten Tomatoes

American biographical films
American crime films
Biographical films about criminals
Biographical television films
Crime films based on actual events
Incest in film
Patricide in fiction
Matricide in fiction
Films about child sexual abuse
Films set in the 1980s
Films set in the 1990s
Lifetime (TV network) films
American films about revenge
2017 films
2010s American films